Kobiety nad przepaścią is a 1938 Polish drama film directed by Emil Chaberski and Michał Waszyński.

Cast
Maria Bogda ...  Marysia Zurkówna 
Nora Ney ...  Lola Ventana 
Jadwiga Andrzejewska...  Iza 
Adam Brodzisz ...  Walek 
Tamara Wiszniewska ...  Róża 
Elżbieta Kryńska ...  Pola 
Nina Świerczewska ...  Franka Zurkówna 
Kazimierz Junosza-Stępowski ...  Wolak 
Stanisław Sielański ...  Stas 
Bogusław Samborski ...  Müller 
Aleksander Żabczyński ...  Klug 
Tadeusz Wesołowski ...  Dance Instructor 
Hanna Parysiewicz ...  Elwira 
Aldona Jasińska ...  Landlady 
Stefan Hnydziński...  Kuba

External links 
 

1938 films
1930s Polish-language films
Polish black-and-white films
Films directed by Michał Waszyński
1938 drama films
Polish drama films